Neurocase is a peer-reviewed journal specializing in case studies in the neuropsychology, neuropsychiatry and behavioral neurology of adults and children. The publisher also maintains a database of all patients from the various studies and articles for reference by Neurocase subscribers. The journal is published bi-monthly by Psychology Press, which also maintains on-line access to articles for subscribers.

References 

Bimonthly journals
English-language journals
Neurology journals
Publications established in 1995

Case report journals